Dongsheng Area is an area and a town on the eastern side of Haidian District, Beijing, China. Its population was 58,151 as of 2020. The name Dongsheng literally translates to "rising from the east“.

History

Administrative Divisions 
In 2021, Dongsheng Area was composed of 12 subdivisions, including 9 communities, 2 villages and 1 residential area:

See also 

 List of township-level divisions of Beijing

References 

Haidian District
Towns in Beijing
Areas of Beijing